Die Pretty, Die Young is the second album by the band Tormé, which was released in 1987 and recorded in 1986-87.

Shortly after this album, singer Phil Lewis joined the band L.A. Guns.

Track listing
 "Let It Rock"
 "The Real Thing"
 "Ready"
 "Sex Action"
 "The Ways of the East"
 "Killer"
 "Memphis"
 "Louise"
 "Crimes of Passion"
 "Ghost Train"

(Note: The song "Sex Action" on this album is not the same song as the song of the same name on L.A. Guns's self-titled album.)

Personnel
Phil Lewis - lead vocals
Bernie Tormé - guitar
Chris Heilman - bass
Ian Whitewood - drums

References

1987 albums
Tormé albums